Phura is a census town in Mara Autonomous District Council in southern part of Mizoram state in Northeast India. It is the only plain area within Maraland. It is often called as the barn of Maraland due to its large production of rice from the fields in the plain surrounding the town. The people of this town speak a dialect of Mara known as Zyhno/Hlaipao Vahapi. It is inhabited by the Hlaipao tribes. It has only two village councils- Phura North and Phura South.

Pala Lake, the biggest lake in Mizoram state lies about 6 km from this town. It is one of the most visited tourist spots in Maraland.

Road connectivity 
 There is daily sumo service from Siaha, the road is not metal yet but quite comfortable. Kaochao-Phura-Tokalo Border Roads Task Force Road is being planned. Kaochao (Kawlchaw) passed through by National Highway-54 (NH-54), it is a village between Lawngtlai and Siaha. From this point, Border Roads Task Force plans to construct a metal road all the way to Tokalo town, beyond Phura. 
 Phura is also connected from Tipa (Tuipang) via Laki-Vahia-Phura by jeepable road.

Member of District Council 
Phura town is represented by one member of the District Council.

Schools 
There is up to High School in Phura. For higher education, students usually go to Siaha, Aizawl and other Indian cities and towns.

Phura News Coverage 
 Maraland.net: Phura news coverage since 2002 in Mara and English.
 Samaw.com: News coverage only in English.

Cities and towns in Saiha district